Bhola-2 is a constituency represented in the Jatiya Sangsad (National Parliament) of Bangladesh since 2014 by Ali Azam of the Awami League.

Boundaries 
The constituency encompasses Burhanuddin and Daulatkhan upazilas.

History 
The constituency was created in 1984 from a Bakerganj constituency when the former Bakerganj District was split into four districts: Bhola, Bakerganj, Jhalokati, and Pirojpur.

Members of Parliament

Elections

Elections in the 2010s

Elections in the 2000s

Elections in the 1990s 

Tofael Ahmed stood for two seats in the 1991 general election: Bhola-1 and Bhola-2. After winning both, he chose to represent the former and quit the latter, triggering a by-election. Mosharraf Hossain Shahjahan of the BNP was elected in a September 1991 by-election.

References

External links
 

Parliamentary constituencies in Bangladesh
Bhola District